The International Alliance for Women (TIAW), formerly known as The National Alliance (1980–1986) and The International Alliance of Professional and Executive Women (TIA) (1986–2002), is a nonprofit corporation founded in 1980 to promote the interests of professional women. It adopted its current name in 2002, and should not be confused with the much older human rights organization International Alliance of Women.

References

External links

Records of the International Alliance for Women, 1979-2004: A Finding Aid. Schlesinger Library, Radcliffe Institute, Harvard University.

 

Organizations established in 1980
International women's organizations